The 2008 Christy Ring Cup was the 4th annual second tier hurling competition organised by the Gaelic Athletic Association. Carlow beat Westmeath in the final after extra time. Carlow were beaten by Laois the bottom team in the Liam MacCarthy Cup and played in the Christy Ring Cup again the following year as a result.

Format
Twelve teams participated in the 2008 Christy Ring Cup.

Group 2A: Roscommon, Westmeath, Wicklow
Group 2B: Carlow, Down, London
Group 2C: Kerry, Mayo, Meath
Group 2D: Armagh, Derry, Kildare

Each team in the group played each other once in the first phase. The top two teams in each group advanced to the quarter-finals. The bottom team in each group went into the relegation play-offs.

Group stage

Group 2A

Group 2B

Group 2C

Group 2D

Knockout stage

Quarter-finals

Semi-finals

Final

Relegation play-offs

Due to a restructuring of the hurling championships the following year, the relegation playoffs were subsequently rendered meaningless as all four teams involved were relegated to the Nicky Rackard Cup for 2009.

Top scorers

Overall

Single game

External links
 GAA Website

Christy Ring Cup
Christy Ring Cup